Syed Ehsan Shah is a Pakistani politician who has been a Member of the Provincial Assembly of the Balochistan since August 2018.

Political career 
Shah served a member of the Senate of Pakistan from 1991 to 1997.

He was elected as MPA of Balochistan Assembly from constituency PB-37 (Kech-I) as a candidate of Balochistan National Party in 1997 Pakistani general elections. Later, he served as provincial Finance Minister from 1997 to 1998 in the cabinet of then Chief Minister Akhtar Mengal.

He was re-elected as MPA of Balochistan Assembly from constituency PB-48 (Kech-I) as a candidate of National Alliance in 2002 Pakistani general elections. He again served as Finance Minister of Balochistan from 2002 to 2007 under the chief minstership of Jam Mohammad Yousaf.

He was re-elected as MPA of Balochistan Assembly from constituency PB-48 (Kech-I) as a candidate of Balochistan National Party (Awami) in 2008 Pakistani general elections. Later, he was also nominated as a candidate of Chief Minister of Balochistan by Balochistan National Party (Awami) but was unsuccessful in its election.

He ran for seat of the Balochistan Assembly from constituency PB-48 (Kech-I) as a candidate of Balochistan National Party (Awami) in 2013 Pakistani general elections but was unsuccessful. He received 4149 votes and lost the seat against National Party's Abdul Malik Baloch.

He was again re-elected to Provincial Assembly of Balochistan from constituency PB-46 (Kech-II) as a candidate of Balochistan National Party (Awami) in 2018 Pakistani general elections.

In February 2019, after owing some political differences with BNP (A)'s central leadership, he later launched his own political party named as Pakistan National Party (Awami).

In November 2021, he was induced into the cabinet of Government of Balochistan as Proviniclal Minister for Health.

References 

Living people
Politicians from Balochistan, Pakistan
Balochistan MPAs 2018–2023
Balochistan MPAs 2008–2013
Balochistan MPAs 2002–2007
Balochistan MPAs 1997–1999
1959 births